Pandora Film, or Pandora Filmproduktion, is a German film production and distribution company, founded by Karl Baumgartner and Reinhard Brundig. The last film they distributed was Norwegian Wood (2007), which was released in 2004 in Germany.

Filmography (production) 

 1995 : Dead Man by Jim Jarmusch
 1996 : Walking and Talking by Nicole Holofcener
 1998 : Black Cat, White Cat by Emir Kusturica
 1998 : Full Moon by Fredi M. Murer
 1999 : Luna Papa by Bakhtiar Khudojnazarov
 1999 : Pola X by Leos Carax
 2001 : Mostly Martha by Sandra Nettelbeck
 2001 : Super 8 Stories by Emir Kusturica
 2003 : Spring, Summer, Fall, Winter... and Spring by Kim Ki-duk
 2003 : The Suit by Bakhtyar Khudojnazarov
 2006 : Valley of Flowers by Pan Nalin
 2007 : O' Horten by Bent Hamer
 2008 : Tulpan by Sergey Dvortsevoy
 2009 : 35 rhums by Claire Denis
 2013 : Only Lovers Left Alive by Jim Jarmusch
 2015 : SKY by Fabienne Berthaud
 2018 : High Life by Claire Denis

External links 
  (in German)

Film production companies of Germany
Film distributors of Germany